Ahmed Khudhair (born 1975) is an Iraqi football coach and former footballer. He played as a forward. He was nicknamed Ahmed Baggio by Iraqi fans.

International career
On October 30, 1999, Khudhair played his debut with Iraq against Estonia in fully international match, in the Friendly match in Abu Dhabi, which ended 1-1.

Coaching career

Al-Quwa Al-Jawiya
Ahmed Khudhair started as an assistant coach to Basim Qasim in Al-Quwa Al-Jawiya in August 2018.

Al-Naft SC
Khudhair continued with Basim Qasim to be his assistant in Al-Naft SC on 12 march of 2019, after leaving Al-Quwa Al-Jawiya.

Al-Zawraa SC
On 20 September 2019, Basim Qasim agreed with Al-Zawraa SC to lead the club, and took Khudhair as an assistant.

Honours

Club
Al-Shorta
Iraqi Elite Cup: 2000

Al-Quwa Al-Jawiya
Iraqi Elite Cup: 1998
Iraqi Super Cup: 2001

Individual
Iraqi Premier League joint-top scorer: 1998–99

References

External links
Ahmed Khudhair at kooora.com (In Arabic)

1975 births
Living people
Sportspeople from Baghdad
Iraqi footballers
Association football forwards
Al-Quwa Al-Jawiya players
Saipa F.C. players
Al-Shahania SC players
Al-Markhiya SC players
Fujairah FC players
Al-Talaba SC players
Al-Shorta SC players
Lebanese Premier League players
Persian Gulf Pro League players
Qatar Stars League players
Qatari Second Division players
UAE Pro League players
Iraq international footballers
Iraqi expatriate footballers
Iraqi expatriate sportspeople in Lebanon
Iraqi expatriate sportspeople in Syria
Iraqi expatriate sportspeople in Iran
Iraqi expatriate sportspeople in Qatar
Iraqi expatriate sportspeople in the United Arab Emirates
Expatriate footballers in Lebanon
Expatriate footballers in Syria
Expatriate footballers in Iran
Expatriate footballers in Qatar
Expatriate footballers in the United Arab Emirates
Syrian Premier League players
Tadamon Sour SC players